The Grand Central Parkway (GCP) is a 14.61-mile (23.51 km) long parkway that stretches from the Triborough Bridge in New York City to Nassau County on Long Island. At the Queens–Nassau border, it becomes the Northern State Parkway, which runs across the northern part of Long Island through Nassau County and into Suffolk County, where it ends in Hauppauge. The westernmost stretch (from the Triborough Bridge to exit 4) also carries a short stretch of Interstate 278 (I-278). The parkway runs through Queens and passes the Cross Island Parkway, Long Island Expressway, LaGuardia Airport and Citi Field, home of the New York Mets. The parkway is designated New York State Route 907M (NY 907M), an unsigned reference route. Despite its name, the Grand Central Parkway was not named after Grand Central Terminal.

The Grand Central Parkway has a few unique distinctions. It is only one of two parkways in New York State to carry an elliptical black-on-white design for its trailblazer, the other being the Henry Hudson Parkway, also in New York City. Other parkways in the Bronx, Manhattan, and Staten Island use the state-standard design, while the Belt-system parkways use a modified version of the Long Island regional parkway shield with the Montauk Point Lighthouse logo. In addition, it is one of the few parkways in the state to allow truck traffic to any extent.

Route description 

The Grand Central Parkway begins at exit 44 off eastbound I-278 (the Brooklyn–Queens Expressway) in the Astoria section of Queens. This is formerly Exit 3 of the Grand Central Parkway, but exit numbers were changed in the early 2000s to coincide with I-278's numbering scheme.  Therefore, Exits 1 (RFK, then Triborough Bridge) and Exit 2 (Randalls Island) were also eliminated and became Exits 46 & 46A respectively.  However, Exit 46A is only signed in the I-278 westbound direction (I-278 eastbound only exits to Manhattan and Randalls Island as a combined Exit 46).  It is also noteworthy that geographically, I-278 runs North-South over the RFK Bridge, but has a cardinal direction of Eastbound toward the Bronx, and Westbound toward Queens, as I-278 continues in a cardinally "westerly" direction as it heads toward Brooklyn, Staten Island, and New Jersey.  Incidentally, the short overlap portion of the Grand Central Parkway in Astoria is signed I-278 East/ GCP West in the Manhattan-bound direction (and vice versa in the Queens-bound direction). The leg of the RFK Bridge that connects Randalls Island with Manhattan Island is NYS Reference Route 900G.

The parkway proceeds east past St. Michaels Cemetery, entering exit 5, which serves 82nd Street and Astoria Boulevard in East Elmhurst, also connecting to the Marine Air Terminal and Terminal A of LaGuardia Airport. After crossing over 82nd Street and Ditmars Boulevard, the parkway enters the airport area, passing south of runway 4-22. During the reconstruction of the LaGuardia terminals, construction has been heavy in the vicinity of exits 6 and 7. As currently configured, eastbound exit 6 is an interchange with 94th Street while exit 7 forks northward on a ramp to the airport's terminals B, C and D. On the westbound side, exit 7 provides access to terminals C and D while exit 6 serves terminal B (in addition to 94th Street). After exit 7, the Grand Central bends southeast and away from LaGuardia Airport, paralleling the Long Island Sound into the eastbound only exit 8, which serves 111th Street.

Entering the Corona section of Queens, the Grand Central enters exit 9, which serves NY 25A (Northern Boulevard) just west of Citi Field. The Grand Central then proceeds south, crossing under the Long Island Rail Road's Port Washington Branch and soon into Flushing Meadows-Corona Park. Through the park, the parkway passes west of Arthur Ashe Stadium, the Queens Zoo and the Unisphere before entering exit 10, a cloverleaf interchange with the Long Island Expressway (I-495). Soon crossing into Forest Hills, the parkway continues through Flushing Meadows-Corona Park, passing Meadow Lake, entering exit 11, connecting to 69th Road and Jewel Avenue in [in Forest Hills]. After that interchange, the parkway bends southeast through Forest Hills, passing Willow Lake and exit 12, which connects to NY 25 (Queens Boulevard) via 78th Avenue.

The Grand Central continues its bend, now proceeding eastward over Jamaica Yard, entering the Kew Gardens Interchange (exits 13, 14 and 15), connecting I-678 (the Van Wyck Expressway), Union Turnpike and the Jackie Robinson Parkway in Kew Gardens. After the Kew Gardens Interchange, the Grand Central Parkway continues east into the Briarwood section of Queens, where exit 16 connects to Parsons Boulevard via a service road. After crossing through the developed neighborhood of Briarwood, the parkway enters Jamaica Hills, passing south of Queens Hospital near 164th Street. Proceeding westbound, an exit (exit 17) is present, connecting to 168th Street, while eastbound, exit 18 connects the Grand Central to Utopia Parkway.

At the interchange with Utopia Parkway, the Grand Central passes south of St. John's University, soon winding northeast into exit 19, which serves 188th Street in Jamaica Estates. After exit 19, the parkway winds eastward into Cunningham Park, where it enters exit 20, which serves Francis Lewis Boulevard and exit 21, which connects to the Clearview Expressway (I-295) and its southern terminus. The parkway leaves Cunningham Park, entering the Bellerose section of Queens, entering exit 22, which connects to Union Turnpike via Stronghurst Avenue. The route then enters Alley Pond Park, where it interchanges with the Cross Island Parkway and Winchester Boulevard. After the interchange, the Grand Central passes west of Creedmoor Hospital, winding northeast into exit 24, which serves Little Neck Parkway before winding northeast to the Nassau County line in Little Neck. At this crossing, the parkway changes names to the Northern State Parkway, which continues east towards Hauppauge.

History
The Grand Central Parkway was first proposed in 1922, as a scenic drive along the high ground of east-central Queens. By the time construction began in 1931, it had been reconceived as extending northwestward to the Triborough Bridge, then in the planning stages, and connecting on the east with the Northern State Parkway, also in the planning stages, thereby among other things providing an easier route from the bridge to Jones Beach. The parkway was widened in 1961 in preparation for the 1964 New York World's Fair in Flushing Meadows–Corona Park.

In 2010 construction began at Kew Gardens Interchange to improve traffic congestion.
Formerly, the frontage road of the Grand Central between BQE and the RFK Bridge served as a truck route, since large trucks are not permitted on the parkway. Exemptions are provided for smaller trucks that conform with strict regulations, but only on the section of the Grand Central that overlaps with I-278. In December 2017, the state concluded a $2.5 million project that lowered the roadbed of the section of the parkway that is concurrent with I-278. This section of I-278 now has a  vertical clearance, which allows most trucks to stay on I-278.

Exit list

References

External links

Grand Central Parkway @ NYCROADS.com
Grand Central Parkway (Greater New York Roads)
Grand Central Parkway (Jeff's Parkway Site, Photo Gallery)

Interstate 78
Transportation in Queens, New York
Parkways in New York City
Robert Moses projects